The Swimming Olympic Centre of Bahia, also referred to as Aquatic Sports Centre of SUDESB, is a sports facility aimed for the practice of swimming in the city of Salvador, capital of the Bahia state in Brazil. It is currently under construction and is expected to be completed by the second semester of 2015. Its total area is 12.195,67 square metres, and consists of two Olympic swimming pools (50m and 25m), 500 seats, dressing rooms, a car park and other dependencies.

See also 
 Júlio Delamare Aquatics Centre
 Maria Lenk Aquatic Center

Swimming venues in Brazil
Sports venues in Salvador, Bahia